Pierre Foucaud (1908–1976) was a French screenwriter and film director. He wrote a number of screenplays for the director André Hunebelle.

Selected filmography
 Quay of Blondes (1954)
 Mademoiselle Strip-tease (Striptease de Paris) (1957)
 Le Bossu (1959)
 Captain Blood (1960)
 The Miracle of the Wolves (1961)
 The Mysteries of Paris (1962)
 Méfiez-vous, mesdames (1963)
 OSS 117 Is Unleashed (1963)
 Shadow of Evil (1964)
 Fantômas contre Scotland Yard (1964)
  Fantômas (1964)
 Fantômas se déchaîne (1965)
 OSS 117 Mission for a Killer (1965)
 Atout cœur à Tokyo pour OSS 117 (1966)
 OSS 117 – Double Agent (1968)

References

Bibliography
 Rège, Philippe. Encyclopedia of French Film Directors, Volume 1. Scarecrow Press, 2009.

External links

1908 births
1976 deaths
People from  Bordeaux
French film directors
French screenwriters